The 2009 Patriot League baseball tournament was held on consecutive weekends with the semifinals held May 9–10 and the finals May 16–17, 2009 to determine the champion of the Patriot League for baseball for the 2009 NCAA Division I baseball season.  The event matched the top four finishers of the six team league in a double-elimination tournament.  Second seeded  won their fifth championship and claimed the Patriot's automatic bid to the 2009 NCAA Division I baseball tournament.  Ben Koenigsfeld of Army was named Tournament Most Valuable Player.

Format and seeding
The top four finishers from the regular season were seeded one through four, with the top seed hosting the fourth seed and second seed hosting the third. The visiting team was designated as the home team in the second game of each series.  Bucknell hosted Lafayette while Holy Cross visited Army.

Results

All-Tournament Team

References

Tournament
Patriot League Baseball Tournament
Patriot League baseball tournament
Patriot League baseball tournament
Patriot League baseball tournament